North West Aviation Transport Company Vyborg was an airline based in Saint Petersburg, Russia, operating chartered passenger flights out of Pulkovo Airport. The company was founded in 2002 and operated a fleet of two Ilyushin Il-114 aircraft, a type of which only 20 have been built. In July 2010, Vyborg was shut down.

Solaris Airlines

Vyborg's airline licence was passed onto Solaris Airlines.

Solaris was owned by Coral Travel and planned to operate as an international charter airline from Vnukovo Airport, but the plan fell through and the venture ceased operation in 2011.

Fleet

 Ilyushin Il-114 - 2
 Airbus A321 - 2 planes transferred from Solaris to Ural Airlines in 2012

References

External links

Official website

Defunct airlines of Russia
Airlines established in 2002
Airlines disestablished in 2010
Russian companies established in 2002
2010 disestablishments in Russia
Companies based in Saint Petersburg